Cremona is a city in northern Italy.

Cremona may also refer to:

Places
The Province of Cremona in northern Italy
 Cremona (crater), a lunar crater
 Cremona, Alberta, a village in Southern Alberta, Canada

People 
 Eusebius of Cremona, a 5th-century Italian monk, pre-congregational saint, and disciple of Jerome
 Himerius of Cremona, Saint (died ca. 560), also known as Himerius of Amelia or Irnerius, Italian Roman Catholic bishop
 Gerard of Cremona (1114–1187), Italian translator
 Roland of Cremona (1178–1259), Italian Dominican theologian and an early scholastic philosopher
 Sicard of Cremona (1155–1215), Italian prelate, historian and writer
 Simon of Cremona (died 1390), Italian writer and well-known preacher of the Augustinian Order
 Girolamo da Cremona, also known as Girolamo de'Corradi, (fl. 1451–1483) Italian Renaissance painter, illuminator and miniaturist of manuscripts
 Luigi Cremona (1830–1903), Italian mathematician
 Cremona diagram, a graphical method used in statics of trusses
 Tranquillo Cremona (1837–1878), Italian painter
 Emvin Cremona (1919–1987), Maltese artist
 Ena Cremona (born 1936), Maltese judge
 Paul Cremona O.P. (born 1946), Maltese theologian and Roman Catholic Archbishop of Malta
 Llywelyn Cremona (born 1995), Maltese professional footballer 
 Mónica Astorga Cremona (born 1967), Argentine nun
 Orazio Cremona (born 1989), South African athlete specialising in the shot put
 Rebecca Cremona, Maltese film director

Others
 U.S. Cremonese, an Italian football club based in Cremona
 44 Infantry Division Cremona, an Italian infantry division of World War II
 Strunal CZ, a.s., formerly the Cremona cooperative, a music instrument manufacturer
 Cremona (album), a 1996 album by Mina
Cremona, a junior synonym of the moth genus Athrips
Cremona cotoneastri,  a moth of the family Gelechiidae